Henry James Atkinson (22 June 1888 – 21 July 1949) was a New Zealand rugby union player. A lock, Atkinson represented West Coast and Otago at a provincial level, and was a member of the New Zealand national side, the All Blacks, in 1913. He played 10 matches for the All Blacks including one international.

Atkinson died in Dunedin in 1949 and was buried at the Dunedin Northern Cemetery.

References

1888 births
1949 deaths
Burials at Dunedin Northern Cemetery
New Zealand international rugby union players
New Zealand rugby union players
Otago rugby union players
Rugby union locks
Rugby union players from Greymouth
West Coast rugby union players